Kostermanthus is a genus of plant in the family Chrysobalanaceae described as a genus in 1979.

Kostermanthus is native to Southeast Asia (Peninsular Malaysia, Borneo, Sumatra, Sulawesi, and the Philippines). It is named in honor of André Joseph Guillaume Henri Kostermans (1906-1994), an Indonesian botanist of Dutch ancestry.

Species
 Kostermanthus heteropetalus  - Peninsular Malaysia, Borneo, Sumatra, Sulawesi, Philippines
 Kostermanthus malayanus  - Perak
 Kostermanthus malayanus  - Malaysia
 Kostermanthus robustus  - Sarawak

References

Chrysobalanaceae
Chrysobalanaceae genera
Flora of Malesia
Malpighiales genera
Taxonomy articles created by Polbot